DDC may stand for:

Distributed Disaggregated Chassis, an open networking design for a router chassis submitted by AT&T to the Open Compute Project. 
Dansk Datamatik Center, a Danish software research and development centre of the 1980s
DDC-I, a Danish and American company created from the work of the above
Deep Dickollective or D/DC
 Defense Documentation Center for Scientific and Technical Information (United States; until 1963: ASTIA Armed Services Technical Information Agency, from 1979: DTIC Defense Technical Information Center)
Detroit Diesel Corporation
Dewey Decimal Classification
Dideoxycytidine or ddC or zalcitabine
Digital distribution copy
Digital down converter, a method in digital signal processing
Direct digital control, reading and steering of HVAC devices
Display Data Channel, a communication protocol between a graphics card and a monitor defined by VESA
District Development Council
Dodge City Regional Airport's IATA code
DOPA decarboxylase or Aromatic-L-amino-acid decarboxylase
Double disc court
Dzongkha Development Commission
United States District Court for the District of Columbia
Dairy Development Corporation of Nepal
District Development Committee (in Nepal)